Conospermum nervosum is a shrub of the Proteaceae that is endemic to Western Australia.

It blooms between May and February producing purple-pink-blue flowers. The blue or sometime pale pink perianth is glabrous or slightly hairy.

The species was first formally described by the botanist Carl Meissner in 1855 as part of the work by William Jackson Hooker New Proteaceae of Australia as published in Hooker's Journal of Botany and Kew Garden Miscellany. There are four synonyms; Conospermum diffusum, Conospermum nervosum var. subspathulatum, Conospermum nervosum var. nervosum and Conospermum nervosum var. ovalifolium.

It is found on hill slopes and sand plains along the west coast to the north of Perth in the Wheatbelt region of Western Australia where it grows in sandy soils. It is part of kwongan communities.

References

External links

nervosum
Endemic flora of Western Australia
Eudicots of Western Australia
Plants described in 1855
Taxa named by Carl Meissner